"For These Times" is a song written by Leslie Satcher and recorded by American country music artist Martina McBride.  It was released in November 2007 as the third single from McBride's album Waking Up Laughing. The song peaked at number 35 on the US Billboard Hot Country Songs chart.

Background and content
"For These Times" was inspired by former Republican senator Rick Santorum, who was defeated in 2006, and his daughter. When his daughter began to cry at his loss, the cameras focused on her, inspiring Leslie Satcher to write the song. It was also inspired by her Pastor, who stated "For these times in which we live, you are going to need this book." referring to the Bible.

Music video
The music video for "For These Times" was shot in New York City and was directed by Sam Erickson.

Chart performance

References

2007 singles
2007 songs
Martina McBride songs
Songs written by Leslie Satcher
RCA Records singles